William Ambrose Shedd (1865–1918) was a US Presbyterian missionary who served in Persia, during the world war one conflict between the Russian and Ottoman empires in the neutral Persia.

He was born January 24, 1865, in the little mountain village of Seir, overlooking the Urmia Plain, from missionary parents John Haskell Shedd and Sarah Jane Dawes Shedd, who had come to devote their lives helping the Assyrian community. Upon the completion of his education at Princeton University, he spent the rest of his life among the Assyrian Christians of northwestern Iran. In 1904 he published a book called Islam and the Oriental Churches: Their historical relations. 

In 1918 it became necessary for Dr. Shedd to distance himself from
missionary work and to apply himself to consular work, as the US Consul in Urmia. He tried to reconcile the Assyrians and the Muslim Persians but without success. However, he has been accused of being among the foreign missionaries flaming the religious conflicts in the first place.

In July 1918 after the Ottoman army advanced toward Urmia, the mass flight of Assyrian Christians from Urmia to the safety of British-occupied Hamadan started. Dr. Shedd and his wife, Mary Lewis Shedd, were with the Assyrians in this flight, and when they had reached Sain Ghala, Dr. Shedd died of cholera and was buried somewhere there. His body was later recovered by his wife and buried in the Armenian Cemetery of Tabriz.

External links
Shedd, Mary Lewis. The Measure of a Man: The Life of William Ambrose Shedd, Missionary to Persia
Estelami, Hooman. The Americans of Urumia: Iran's First Americans and their Mission to the Assyrian Christians
The Measure of a Man: The Life of William Ambrose Shedd, Missionary to Persia by Mary Lewis Shedd, reviewed by George Yana (Bebla), Journal of Assyrian Academic Studies
The Book of Missionary Heroes by Basil Mathews (2008). Chapter XXV. The Moses of the Assyrians, p. 204

Assyrian genocide
American Presbyterian missionaries
1918 deaths
1865 births
Presbyterian missionaries in Iran
American expatriates in Iran
People from West Azerbaijan Province
Burials in Iran
Dawes family